Sarısaman is a village in the Genç District, Bingöl Province, Turkey. The village is populated by Kurds of the Ziktî tribe and had a population of 130 in 2021.

The hamlets of Akbıyık, Dikmeli, Doğrualan, İkizce, Şaban, Yapraklı and Yıldızlı are attached to the village.

References 

Villages in Genç District
Kurdish settlements in Bingöl Province